The Password Is Courage is a 1962 British comedy-drama war film from Metro-Goldwyn-Mayer, based on John Castle's 1954 World War II memoir of the same name. Written, produced, and directed by Andrew L. Stone, the film stars Dirk Bogarde, Maria Perschy, and Alfred Lynch. It is a lighthearted take on the true story of Sergeant-Major Charles Coward, written under the pseudonym John Castle by Ronald Charles Payne and John Williams Garrod.

Plot
Sergeant-Major Charles Coward (Dirk Bogarde) is a senior British NCO incarcerated in the prisoner of war camp Stalag VIII-B. He encourages his fellow inmates to escape, and tries to humiliate the German guards at every opportunity.

When he was being transferred to Stalag VIII-B, the injured Coward escaped from a forced POW march, finding refuge in a French farmhouse and barn that is soon requisitioned by a German army unit needing to set up a field hospital. Inadvertently thought to be a wounded German soldier, Coward is taken to a hospital, where his identity is soon discovered, but not before he is awarded the Iron Cross as he lies in his hospital bed.

Coward is sent on to Stalag VIII-B, but on the way to the camp he engineers the total destruction of a passing enemy ammunition train using tossed bundles of straw, set on fire with his cigarette lighter. At the camp he is involved in the elaborate tunnel-digging schemes and plans an escape with fellow prisoner Bill Pope (Alfred Lynch). Unfortunately an older, closed tunnel is discovered by camp officials, but not their primary tunnel. Coward then attempts to deceive his camp commander and Luftwaffe officials that he has knowledge of a secret allied bomb sight. He receives special favours, which he uses to bribe guards to get vital materials needed for the coming escape.

When his ruse is discovered Coward is transferred to a work camp in occupied Poland where he is set up by the Germans as a traitor, with the camp's commanding officer trying to use his fellow British prisoners to kill Coward. When the scheme fails, he tricks the Unteroffizier (Reginald Beckwith), into thinking he was responsible for a devastating fire that Coward had actually engineered. Coward extracts an extraordinary privilege in being able to go to and from the neighbouring town without an escort. When he makes contact with an attractive Polish resistance agent (Maria Perschy), he attempts to leave Germany by rail with his new friend providing assistance, but he is captured at a railway station.

After the failure of that escape, Coward and his other escape partner, Pope, are assigned to the IG Farben work camp. They manage to escape again by masquerading as workmen clearing rubble in a rural area. After learning that the American front line is only a mile away, they steal an unattended fire engine in order to get past the enemy soldiers blocking their escape. Their plan works. A German troop convoy on the road moves aside to allow them to speed past to get to a non-existent fire, and they drive off to freedom.

Cast
 Dirk Bogarde as Sergeant-Major Charles Coward
 Maria Perschy as Irena
 Alfred Lynch as Corporal Bill Pope
 Nigel Stock as Cole
 Reginald Beckwith as Unteroffizier
 Richard Marner as Schmidt
 Ed Devereaux as the Aussie
 Lewis Fiander as Pringle
 George Mikell as Necke
 Richard Carpenter as Robinson
 Bernard Archard as first prisoner of war 
 Ferdy Mayne as first German officer at French farm 
 George Pravda as second German officer at French farm 
 Olaf Pooley as German doctor 
 Michael Mellinger as Feldwebel 
 Colin Blakely as first German goon 
 Margaret Whiting as French farm woman 
 Mark Eden as second prisoner of war 
 Douglas Livingstone as Bennett
 Arnold Marlé as Old Man on Train
 Charles Durning as American GI (uncredited)

Cast notes: Richard Marner appeared in the role of German officer Schmidt; he later played another German officer in the 1980s BBC comedy 'Allo 'Allo!.

Production

The Password Is Courage is based on John Castle's biography of Sergeant-Major Charles Coward. Serving as technical advisor during the filming, Coward also has a cameo in the film during a party scene. The film is shot entirely in England; street scenes were filmed in the Chiltern market towns of Amersham and Chesham.

The film raised some debate among ex-prisoners of war. There are no known survivors of any of Coward's escapes, and the National Ex-Prisoner of War Association (in its Autumn 2006 newsletter) suggested that some of the stories in his biography might have happened to other men in the camps, with some events "borrowed" for the book and for the film.

In 2013, Shimon Peres, then president of Israel, disclosed that his father, Yitzchak Perski, who immigrated from Poland to Mandatory Palestine in 1932, had joined the British Army in 1939 and was captured by the Germans in Greece in 1941. Perski and Coward had been fellow prisoners, and Peres claimed that some episodes in the film were based on his father's exploits at that time.

The original cinema version of The Password Is Courage contained a sequence set in Auschwitz concentration camp, illustrated by drawings. This sequence has been cut from television broadcast prints, but a credit for the drawings remains listed in the film credits.

Reception
The Password Is Courage received mixed reviews from critics because this true story of a prisoner of war was done in a jocular vein, and was considered inauthentic as a result. The review in Variety noted: "Andrew L. Stone’s screenplay, based on a biog of Sergeant-Major Charles Coward by John Castle, has pumped into its untidy 116 minutes an overdose of slapstick humour. Result is that what could have been a telling tribute to a character of guts and initiative, the kind that every war produces, lacks conviction".

According to Kinematograph Weekly the film was considered a "money maker" at the British box office in 1962.

See also
 List of British films of 1962

References
Explanatory notes

Citations

Bibliography

 Castle, John. The Password is Courage. London: Monarch Books, 2002, First edition: 1954. .
 Morley, Sheridan. Dirk Bogarde: Rank Outsider.  Pontarddulais, Swansea, UK: Macmillan Distribution Limited, 2000. .
 Tanitch, Robert. Dirk Bogarde: The Complete Career Illustrated. London: Ebury Pres, 1988. .

External links
 
 
 

1962 films
British World War II films
British biographical films
Films based on non-fiction books
World War II films based on actual events
World War II prisoner of war films
Films directed by Andrew L. Stone
Metro-Goldwyn-Mayer films
1960s English-language films
1960s British films